

Tournament 

Kisei (Go)
1999 in go